HanDover is the eleventh studio album by Canadian band Skinny Puppy.

After 2007's Mythmaker and its accompanying tour, the band returned to work on a new album in 2008. This new material was noise music, in the vein of Lou Reed's Metal Machine Music and was initially intended to be "handed over" to their Hannover label in time for their 2009 international tour. Trouble arose, however, when their label, SPV GmbH, ran into insolvency problems and the album's fate became uncertain. Rather than cancel all plans, the 2009 tour went on as planned and was named In Solvent See to reflect the events occurring at SPV. Ogre has suggested that this "handing over" of albums and assets inspired the album's title
Still under contract and unable to release the album until SPV's financial issues were sorted, Skinny Puppy continued work on the production of their album.

While some material originally intended for the aborted noise album evolved into the songs "Brownstone" and "Noisex", Mark Walk and Ogre took their noise ideas and further developed them for the ohGr album unDeveloped.

In early 2011, Sasha Coon, Skinny Puppy's former live crew member and friend died inspiring the song "Ashas" which is dedicated to Sasha's memory.

In May 2011, Skinny Puppy announced that they had finished recording their new album and that they were soliciting it to record labels in hopes of securing a September 2011 release date, though its release date would eventually be confirmed as October 25 in the United States and an October 28, 2011 release in Europe.

Track listing

Personnel 

 Ogre – vocals, synths
 cEvin Key – synths, percussion, electronics, guitar, theremin
 Mark Walk – programming, bass, guitar
 Ken "Hiwatt" Marshall – programming, synths, FX
 Traz Damji – additional programming, synths
 Saki Kaskas – guitar

Chart positions

References

External links
 
 

2011 albums
Skinny Puppy albums